Here is an incomplete list of locomotives and multiple units used by the narrow-gauge railways in Russia.

Steam locomotives

Diesel locomotives

Diesel multiple units and railcar

See also
 Kambarka Engineering Works
 Narrow-gauge railways in Russia

References

External links

 Narrow-gauge rolling stock (Russian)
 Narrow-gauge diesel locomotives (Russian)
 Narrow-gauge diesel locomotives Kambarka (Russian)

Railway locomotive-related lists
Narrow-gauge
Russian narrow-gauge railways